María Pinto is a town and commune of the Melipilla Province in central Chile's Santiago Metropolitan Region.

Administration
As a commune, María Pinto is a third-level administrative division of Chile administered by a municipal council, headed by an alcalde who is directly elected every four years. The 2012-2016 alcalde is Cesar Araos Aguirre (UDI), and his council members are:
 Mario Donoso Araya (PDC)
 Elias Jacob Hirmas (IND)
 Carlos Acevedo Barrera (UDI)
 Margarita Cofré Olguin (PDC)
 Sonia Vargas Farias (PPD)
 Claudia Atabales Alarcón (UDI)

Within the electoral divisions of Chile, María Pinto is represented in the Chamber of Deputies by Denise Pascal (PS) and Gonzalo Uriarte (UDI) as part of the 31st electoral district, (together with Talagante, Peñaflor, El Monte, Isla de Maipo, Melipilla, Curacaví, Alhué, San Pedro and Padre Hurtado). The commune is represented in the Senate by Guido Girardi Lavín (PPD) and Jovino Novoa Vásquez (UDI) as part of the 7th senatorial constituency (Santiago-West).

References

External links
  Municipality of María Pinto

Communes of Chile
Populated places in Melipilla Province